Castilleja linariifolia is a perennial plant, native to the United States and is the state flower of Wyoming. It has a number of common names including Wyoming Indian paintbrush, narrow-leaved Indian paintbrush, desert paintbrush, Wyoming desert paintbrush, Wyoming paintbrush, linaria-leaved Indian Paintbrush, and Indian paintbrush.

Description
It is a perennial herb. It grows up to one meter in height and has sparse, linear leaves which are between 20 and 80 mm in length and have up to 3 lobes. The flowers, which consist of a pinkish-red to yellow calyx and yellow-green floral tube, appear in panicles or spikes between June and September in its native range.

Distribution and habitat

This species occurs on rocky slopes and arid plains and is associated with sagebrush scrub as well as pinyon pine or juniper woodland. It is native to Arizona, California, Colorado, Idaho, Montana, New Mexico, Nevada, Oregon, Utah and Wyoming.

State flower
When options were being considered for a state flower for Wyoming, Dr. Grace Raymond Hebard from the University of Wyoming promoted this species over rival candidates including the columbine and fringed gentian.

The State of Wyoming officially adopted the Indian paintbrush ("Castilleja linariaefolia") as the state flower of Wyoming on January 31, 1917.

See also
List of U.S. state flowers

References

External links

linariifolia
Flora of the Western United States
Flora of California
Flora of Colorado
Flora of Idaho
Flora of Montana
Flora of New Mexico
Flora of Nevada
Flora of Oregon
Flora of Utah
Flora of Wyoming
Flora of the California desert regions
Flora of the Great Basin
Natural history of the California chaparral and woodlands
Flora of the Cascade Range
Flora of the Klamath Mountains
Flora of the Sierra Nevada (United States)
Natural history of the California Coast Ranges
Natural history of the Central Valley (California)
Natural history of the Channel Islands of California
Natural history of the Mojave Desert
Natural history of the Peninsular Ranges
Natural history of the San Francisco Bay Area
Natural history of the Santa Monica Mountains
Natural history of the Transverse Ranges
Symbols of Wyoming
Flora without expected TNC conservation status